Thicker Than Blood: The Larry McLinden Story is a 1994 drama television film directed by Michael Dinner, written by Judson Klinger, and starring Peter Strauss, Rachel Ticotin and Lynn Whitfield. The film first aired on March 6, 1994 on the Columbia Broadcasting System. It is based on a true story of a Californian custody battle.

The film was filmed in Toronto, Ontario, Canada. Four years after the film's release, main stars Peter Strauss and Rachel Ticotin married, on 31 December 1998. Although the film did not see a home video release in America, it was released on both VHS and DVD in 2004 in the UK through Odyssey under the title Thicker Than Blood. During the 1990s, the film was also released on VHS in Brazil by Mundial Filmes.

Plot
Securities broker Larry McLinden (Peter Strauss) and Diane Middleton (Rachel Ticotin) are experiencing a rocky affair when Diane announces that she's pregnant. When it's discovered that infant Larry Jr. has traces of cocaine in his blood, the couple's romance is over. Except Larry - now far more enthusiastic about parenthood - wants custody of the child, whom Diane has taken to Florida. Larry's attorney (Lynn Whitfield) sues, and a custody arrangement is set up, which Diane soon breaks, explaining that her son needs more time with her. Then she marries David Meadows (Booth Savage), and tells Larry that the two will try to adopt Larry Jr. As the fight drags on, Diane surprises everyone by suddenly truthfully claiming, contrary to everything she'd said before, that Larry is not the child's biological father, causing things to become even more complicated.

Cast
 Peter Strauss as Larry McLinden
 Rachel Ticotin as Diane
 Lynn Whitfield as Bobbie Mallory
 Brenda Bazinet as Mary
 Jacob Zelik Penn as Larry Jr.
 Bob Dishy as Glen Schwartz
 Susan Hogan as Dr. Sandra Baldwin
 Carolyn Dunn as Nikki Amato 
 Patricia Gage as Judge Lara Parkes
 Mark Wilson as Jay Kessler
 Booth Savage as David Meadows
 Maia Filar as Tina (11)
 Tara Strong as Tina (16)
 Gil Filar as Andy (7)
 Sherry Miller as Linda
 Victoria Snow as Claudia
 Kevin Zegers as Larry (1954)

Critical reception
AllMovie gave the film a rating of two and a half out of five stars. Digiguide.TV gave the film three out of five stars. Locate TV gave a favorable review and described the film as a "powerful tug-of-love drama." Variety was unfavorable, stating: "Title and casting lead to belief that sympathy is supposed to be with McLinden, but in Judson Klinger's diffuse script, Larry is dumb as a stump. Everybody plays this in deadly earnest among generic Toronto locations. Michael Dinner's rote direction shows no energy; tech credits are routine."

References

External links
 

1994 television films
1994 drama films
1994 films
American films based on actual events
American drama television films
CBS network films
1990s English-language films
1990s American films
Films directed by Michael Dinner